North Pulaski High School was a public secondary school located in Jacksonville, Arkansas and served students in grades 9 through 12.  North Pulaski was administered by the Pulaski County Special School District.  Since 1979, North Pulaski has been accredited by the AdvancED. North Pulaski was merged with Jacksonville High School in 2016 as a part of the Jacksonville North Pulaski School District.

Academics 
The assumed course of study for students follows the Smart Core curriculum developed by the Arkansas Department of Education (ADE), which requires students complete 22 units with 16 core and 6 career focus and elective units. Students complete regular (core and career focus) courses and exams and may select Advanced Placement (AP) coursework and exams that provide an opportunity for college credit.

Awards and recognition 
North Pulaski maintains a student-run Simply Delicious restaurant as part of the school's culinary arts program. NPHS is a member of the National Restaurant Association Educational Foundation (NRAEF) that sponsors ProStart®, which is a nationwide, two-year high school program that unites the classroom and industry to develop students into restaurant and foodservice leaders. Students may qualify for the ProStart National Certificate of Achievement (COA) and compete in the state's ProStart competitions in two categories: restaurant management and culinary arts. In 2013, North Pulaski won both  and represented Arkansas at the National ProStart Invitational competition.

Creative and performing arts
The school band programs perform at various competitions including invitationals and regional assessments administered by the Arkansas School Band and Orchestra Association (ASBOA). The North Pulaski High School Band is a 23-time consecutive winner of the ASBOA Sweepstakes Award, which denotes 1st Division ratings in sight-reading, concert band composite and marching band composite scoring. In addition, the marching band has been awarded the 1991 Sweepstakes Winner at Worlds of Fun Music Festival in Kansas City, Missouri; the 1994 Best in Class at North American Music Festival in Atlanta, Georgia and the Arkansas representative in the 1997, 2000 and 2003 National Independence Day Parade in Washington, DC. The choral program at North Pulaski continuously scores First Division ratings at evaluative festivals, and places large numbers of students in the Region and State choirs.

In 2012, Karen Dismuke received the Arkansas Bandmaster of the Year award.

The Drama and Competitive Speech program at North Pulaski is competitive and became one of the charter chapters of the Arkansas District of the National Forensic League (speech and debate honor society). North Pulaski has won Sweepstake awards at statewide tournaments and produce two mainstage productions a year. North Pulaski is known for its Performing Arts Department offering classes in Drama, Stagecraft, and Competitive Speaking.

Athletics
The North Pulaski High School mascot is the falcon and maroon and gold are the school colors. For 2012-14, the North Pulaski Falcons compete in the 7A Central Conference administered by the Arkansas Activities Association (AAA) in several interscholastic athletic activities including: football, cross country (boys and girls), baseball, basketball (boys and girls), track & field (boys and girls), wrestling, volleyball (girls), and soccer.

The 5A-Central Conference members (2012–14) include:

 Helena-West Helena Central Mighty Cougars
 Little Rock Christian Academy Warriors
 Jacksonville Red Devils
 McClellan Crimson Lions
 Mills University Studies Comets
 North Pulaski Falcons
 Pulaski Academy Bruins
 Sylvan Hills Bears

At the 2007 homecoming game against the Greene County Tech Eagles, the Falcon football team snapped its 32-game losing streak it had since September 2004 scoring 56-6.

The North Pulaski wrestling team under the direction of Coach Mongno and basketball teams under the guidance of Raymond Cooper were state runners up in the 2008-2009 school year.

References

Educational institutions established in 1979
Pulaski County Special School District
Public high schools in Arkansas
High schools in Pulaski County, Arkansas
1979 establishments in Arkansas